Ivanovka is a village in the Ysyk-Ata District of the Chüy Region, of Kyrgyzstan, approximately midway between Tokmok and Kant. Its population was 17,513 in 2021. It is known for its multi-ethnic composition, including Kyrgyz, Russians and Dungans. Its economy focuses on agriculture in the Chüy Valley, Kyrgyzstan's largest northern agricultural area.

Population

References

Populated places in Chüy Region